Hemicalypterus is an extinct genus of prehistoric ray-finned fish that lived during the late Triassic period (approx. 221.4 to 205.6 Ma). It contains a single species, Hemicalypterus weiri. Fossils have been collected in the southwestern United States, including Utah and New Mexico. Hemicalypterus belonged to the family Dapediidae, and like other members of its family, it was a deep-bodied fish with a covering of thick ganoid scales. It differed from other dapediids in lacking scales on the posterior part of the body, and in possessing unusual, multicuspid teeth. These teeth were similar to those of modern-day herbivorous fish, which indicates that Hemicalypterus may have been a herbivore as well.

See also
 List of prehistoric bony fish genera

References

External links
 Bony fish in the online Sepkoski Database

Dapediidae
Prehistoric ray-finned fish genera
Triassic bony fish
Triassic fish of North America
Extinct animals of Utah
Natural history of New Mexico
Fossil taxa described in 1967